Trifurcula graeca is a moth of the family Nepticulidae. It was described by A. and Z. Laštuvka in 1998. It is known from Lakonia, Greece. The host plant for the species is possibly Genista acanthoclada.

References

Nepticulidae
Moths of Europe
Moths described in 1998